Angkor Borei is a district located in Takéo Province, in southern Cambodia. According to the 1998 census of Cambodia, it had a population of 44,980.

Administration
The district has 6 communes, 34 villages (as of 2019).

History

This ancient city was an important settlement of the Kingdom of Funan and may have been its capital. It may have been the Thinae, or Sinae Metropolis located by Claudius Ptolemy as the farthest known city to the east in his Geography.
The site was first excavated in 1996 and was again excavated in 1999 as part of the Lower Mekong Archaeological Project. During the 1996 excavation, the University of Hawaii and the Royal University of Fine Arts initiated the excavation and focused on the sociopolitical complexity from 500 BC to 500 AD. This first excavation, however, was just preliminary research. The first objectives were:

1) Documentation of the site's layout and the range of its archaeological features

2) Evaluation of the integrity of subsurface materials and description of the site's stratigraphy

3) Collection of samples for dating portions of the archaeological site

4) Reconstructing the hydrology and natural environment of the early historic period in this region

In this site various archaeological methods were used such as surface survey and mapping, test excavations, auger sampling and coring, and trenching with a backhoe.

Unfortunately, the archeological project was disturbed by looting and illicit trafficking of Khmer antiquities, which continues as a serious problem into the 21st century.

It is the birthplace of Norodom, King of Cambodia from 1860 to 1904.

See also
Angkor Borei and Phnom Da

References

 
Webarchive template wayback links
Funan
Districts of Takéo province